Nicotiana suaveolens, the Australian tobacco, is a herb to 1.5 metres tall. Growing in New South Wales and Victoria.

References 
 

suaveolens
Tobacco
Tobacco in Australia
Flora of Victoria (Australia)
Flora of New South Wales